Retro-engineering can refer to:
 Personalization, adaptation or retrofitting of a product or device that was not intended to be modified
 Reverse engineering, the process of discovering the technological principles of something by analysis of it